Scribonius was a man of unknown origin, possibly Roman or Hellenistic. He claimed to be a descendant of Mithridates VI of Pontus, the earlier king of Pontus who had also ruled the Bosporus. Through this, he claimed the throne of the Bosporan Kingdom in 17 BC. The real king of the Bosporus, Asander starved himself because of this. He somehow convinced the wife of Asander, Dynamis to marry him. When Augustus learned of what Scribonius had done he sent Marcus Vipsanius Agrippa to remove Scribonius. Agrippa then sent Polemon I of Pontus to remove Scribonius and take the throne himself. Scribonius was murdered by the Bosporans, leaving Dynamis as sole ruler of the country. When Polemon took the throne, he married Dynamis to legitimise his claim.

See also
 Scribonia gens

References

Sources
 The Roman History: The Reign of Augustus
 Encyclopedia of Women in the Ancient World

Monarchs of the Bosporan Kingdom
1st-century BC rulers in Europe
1st-century BC Romans
16 BC deaths
Usurpers
Scribonii